Sarah Kate Silverman (born December 1, 1970) is an American stand-up comedian, actress, and writer. Silverman first garnered widespread attention for her brief stint as a writer and cast member on the NBC sketch comedy series Saturday Night Live during its 19th season between 1993 and 1994. Since leaving SNL, she has starred in and produced The Sarah Silverman Program, which ran from 2007 to 2010 on Comedy Central. For her work on the program, Silverman was nominated for a Primetime Emmy Award for Outstanding Lead Actress in a Comedy Series. She released an autobiography The Bedwetter in 2010. She also appeared in other television programs, such as Mr. Show and V.I.P. and starred in films, including Who's the Caboose? (1997), School of Rock (2003), Wreck-It Ralph (2012),  A Million Ways to Die in the West (2014) and Ralph Breaks the Internet (2018). In 2015, she starred in the drama I Smile Back, for which she was nominated for a Screen Actors Guild Award for Outstanding Performance by a Female Actor in a Leading Role.

During the 2016 United States presidential election, she became increasingly politically active; she initially campaigned for Bernie Sanders but later spoke in support of Hillary Clinton at the 2016 Democratic National Convention. She hosted the Hulu streaming television late-night talk show I Love You, America with Sarah Silverman from 2017 until late 2018.

Her comedy roles address social taboos and controversial topics, including racism, sexism, homophobia, politics, and religion, sometimes having her comic character endorse them in a satirical or deadpan fashion. She has won two Primetime Emmy Awards for her work on television.

Early life
Sarah Kate Silverman was born on December 1, 1970, in Bedford, New Hampshire, to Beth Ann née Halpin (1941–2015) and Donald Silverman. She was raised in Manchester, New Hampshire. Beth had been George McGovern's personal campaign photographer and founded the theater company New Thalian Players, while Donald trained as a social worker and also ran the clothing store Crazy Sophie's Outlet. Silverman's parents divorced and later married others. Silverman is the youngest of five children. Her sisters are Reform rabbi Susan Silverman, writer Jodyne Speyer and actress Laura Silverman; her brother Jeffrey Michael died when he was three months old. She is of Ashkenazi Jewish descent and considers herself nonreligious. Her ancestors were from Poland and Russia, and she has stated her maternal grandmother escaped the Holocaust. She was in attendance when women lit menorahs at the Western Wall for the first time, in December 2014.
 
The first time Silverman performed stand-up comedy was in Boston at age seventeen. She described her performance as "awful". After graduating from The Derryfield School in Manchester in 1989, she attended New York University for a year, but did not graduate. Instead, she performed stand-up in Greenwich Village.

Career

1992–2007: Career beginnings and Jesus Is Magic

After beginning her stand-up career in 1992, Silverman was part of the 1993–94 season of the NBC sketch comedy program Saturday Night Live (SNL) for eighteen weeks as a writer and featured player. She was fired after one season. Only one of the sketches she wrote made it to dress rehearsal and none aired, though she did appear on the show as a cast member in skits, usually in smaller supporting roles. Bob Odenkirk, a former SNL writer, explained: "I could see how it wouldn't work at SNL because she's got her own voice, she's very much Sarah Silverman all the time. She can play a character but she doesn't disappear into the character—she makes the character her." Silverman has retrospectively stated that she was not ready for SNL when she secured the job, and that when she was fired, it hurt her confidence for a year but after that nothing could hurt her and attributes her SNL stint as being a key reason why she has been so tough in her career. She later expressed gratitude that her time at SNL was short as it did not wind up defining her. She parodied the situation when she appeared on The Larry Sanders Show episode "The New Writer" (1996), playing Sanders' new staff writer, whose jokes are not used because of the chauvinism and bias of the male chief comedy writer, who favors the jokes of his male co-writers. She appeared in three episodes of Larry Sanders during its final two seasons.

She also starred in the HBO sketch comedy series Mr. Show (1995–1997) and had the leading role for the 1997 independent film Who's the Caboose?, about a pair of New York comedians (Silverman and director Sam Seder) going to Los Angeles during pilot season to try to get a part in a television series; the film features numerous young comedians in supporting roles but never received a widespread theatrical release. Silverman and Seder later made a six-episode television series sequel titled Pilot Season in which Silverman stars as the same character and Seder again directed. She made her network stand-up comedy debut on the Late Show with David Letterman on July 3, 1997.

Silverman made several TV program guest appearances, including on Star Trek: Voyager in the two-part time-travel episode "Future's End" (1996); Seinfeld in the episode "The Money" (1997); V.I.P. in the episode "48 Hours" (2002); Greg the Bunny as a series regular (2002); and on the puppet television comedy Crank Yankers as the voice of Hadassah Guberman (since 2002). She had small parts in the films There's Something About Mary, Say It Isn't So, School of Rock, The Way of the Gun, Overnight Delivery, Screwed, Heartbreakers, Evolution, School for Scoundrels, Funny People and Rent, playing a mixture of comic and serious roles.

In 2005, Silverman released a concert film, Sarah Silverman: Jesus Is Magic, based on her one-woman show of the same name. Liam Lynch directed the film, which was distributed by Roadside Attractions. It received 64% positive ratings based on 84 reviews on the film critics aggregator Web site Rotten Tomatoes and earned approximately $1.3 million at the box office. As part of the film's publicity campaign, she appeared online in Slate as the cover subject of Heeb magazine and in roasts on Comedy Central of Pamela Anderson and Hugh Hefner.

Silverman played a therapist in a skit for a bonus DVD of the album Lullabies to Paralyze by the band Queens of the Stone Age. Silverman also appears at the end of the video for American glam metal band Steel Panther's "Death To All But Metal". On Jimmy Kimmel Live!, Silverman parodied sketches from Chappelle's Show, replaying Dave Chappelle's characterizations of Rick James and "Tyrone" as well as a Donnell Rawlings character based on the miniseries Roots. In 2006, Silverman placed 50th on Maxim Hot 100 List. In 2007, she placed 29th and appeared on the cover.

2007–2010: The Sarah Silverman Program

Her television sitcom The Sarah Silverman Program debuted on Comedy Central in February 2007; the series had 1.81 million viewers and portrayed the day-to-day adventures of fictionalized versions of Silverman, her sister Laura and their friends. A number of comedic actors from Mr. Show have appeared on The Sarah Silverman Program. Silverman was nominated for a Primetime Emmy Award for her acting on the show. At the awards ceremony, she wore a fake mustache. Comedy Central canceled The Sarah Silverman Program after three seasons.

In June 2007, she hosted the MTV Movie Awards. During her opening act, she commented on the upcoming jail sentence of Paris Hilton, who was in the audience, saying: "In a couple of days, Paris Hilton is going to jail. As a matter of fact, I heard that to make her feel more comfortable in prison, the guards are going to paint the bars to look like penises. I think it is wrong, too. I just worry she is going to break her teeth on those things." In September 2007, she appeared at the MTV Video Music Awards. Following the comeback performance of Britney Spears, Silverman mocked her on stage, saying: "Yo, she is amazing, man. I mean, she is 25 years old, and she has already accomplished everything she's going to accomplish in her life."

In January 2008, she appeared on Jimmy Kimmel Live! to show Jimmy Kimmel, her boyfriend at the time, a special video. The video turned out to be a song called "I'm Fucking Matt Damon" in which she and Matt Damon sang a duet about having an affair behind Kimmel's back. The video created an "instant YouTube sensation." She won a Primetime Emmy Award for Outstanding Original Music and Lyrics at the 60th Primetime Emmy Awards. Kimmel responded with his own video a month later with Damon's friend Ben Affleck, which enlisted a panoply of stars to record Kimmel's song "I'm Fucking Ben Affleck". On September 13, 2008, Silverman won a Creative Arts Emmy Award for writing the song "I'm Fucking Matt Damon". Silverman guest-starred in a second-season episode of the USA cable program Monk as Marci Maven. She returned in the sixth-season premiere and for the 100th episode. According to the audio commentary on the Clerks II DVD, director Kevin Smith offered her the role that eventually went to Rosario Dawson, but she turned it down out of fear of being typecast in "girlfriend roles". However, she told Smith the script was "really funny" and mentioned that if the role of Randal Graves was being offered to her she "would do it in a heartbeat." She appeared in Strange Powers, the 2009 documentary by Kerthy Fix and Gail O'Hara about cult songwriter Stephin Merritt and his band The Magnetic Fields. Silverman wrote a comic memoir, The Bedwetter: Stories of Courage, Redemption, and Pee, which was published in 2010.

2011–present: Take This Waltz and other projects
Silverman played Geraldine alongside Michelle Williams and Seth Rogen in Take This Waltz, written and directed by Sarah Polley. The film was well received when it premiered at the 2011 Toronto International Film Festival (TIFF) and was picked up by Magnolia for U.S. distribution in summer 2012. At TIFF, she told the press she had deliberately gained weight for the part, which required a nude scene, emphasizing that Polley wanted "real bodies and real women". In interviews, she warned fans not to expect too much. However, she later told podcaster and author Julie Klausner that she had not really gained weight and that the statements were meant as self-deprecating humor.

On September 20, 2012, Silverman made a public service announcement (PSA) criticizing new voter identification laws that create obstacles to the ability of certain groups to vote in the November presidential election, i.e., young, old, poor and minority citizens. The project was financed by the Jewish Council for Education & Research (JCER) and was co-produced by Mik Moore and Ari Wallach (the pair that also co-produced The Great Schlep and Scissor Sheldon).

Silverman voiced Vanellope von Schweetz, one of the main characters in the 2012 Disney animated film Wreck-It Ralph. She reprised the role in the 2018 sequel Ralph Breaks the Internet. She is in the creative team that writes and produces the content for the YouTube comedy channel called Jash. The other partners are Michael Cera, Reggie Watts and Tim Heidecker and Eric Wareheim (also known as Tim & Eric). The JASH channel premiered online March 10, 2013. In Seth MacFarlane's western comedy film, A Million Ways to Die in the West, she played Ruth, a prostitute, who is in love with Edward (Giovanni Ribisi). It was released on May 30, 2014.

In 2013, HBO announced that Silverman would star with Patti LuPone and Topher Grace in a situation comedy pilot called People in New Jersey, produced by SNLs Lorne Michaels. The pilot was not picked up for a series order.

From 2017 to 2018, she hosted the Hulu streaming television late-night talk show I Love You, America with Sarah Silverman. On October 10, 2019, she was featured in a 30-minute YouTube documentary called Laughing Matters, created by SoulPancake in collaboration with Funny or Die, wherein a variety of comedians discuss mental health.

After being unable to do stand-up shows during the COVID-19 pandemic, Silverman launched The Sarah Silverman Podcast in October 2020, in which she discusses topics ranging from her personal life to societal issues, politics and current events, as well as responding to listener call-ins.

Controversies

In 2001, Silverman used the word "chink" in an ironic fashion in the context of a joke during a TV interview with Conan O'Brien which Guy Aoki of the Media Action Network for Asian Americans (MANAA) publicly objected to.

A minor controversy arose over Silverman's performance in the 2005 documentary The Aristocrats. The film includes her retelling of the Aristocrats jokea sample of transgressive art told by numerous comedians since the vaudeville eraas if it were an autobiographical account of her life as a child sex performer. As part of the punchline, she deadpans that longtime New York radio and TV personality Joe Franklin raped her. After the film's release, Franklin took offense at Silverman using his name in the routine, and considered suing her; a month later he claimed the "best thing" he could do was "get Sarah better writers so she'd have funnier material."

In a 2007 episode of The Sarah Silverman Program, she played a character in a sketch who wore blackface and said "I look like the beautiful Queen Latifah." Silverman said in 2019 that the sketch had then-recently caused her to be fired from an undisclosed film.

During the MTV Movie Awards in June 2007, hosted by Silverman, the comedian joked in her opening monologue about Paris Hilton going to jail for violating probation on an alcohol-related drunk-driving conviction, leaving Hiltonwho was in attendancelooking noticeably uncomfortable. Silverman apologized for the jokes in 2021. Later that year, she was criticized for calling Britney Spears' two sons "adorable mistakes" at the 2007 MTV Video Music Awards, and for mocking Spears' "slutty clothes". Silverman's monologue garnered renewed criticism in 2021, in the wake of the documentary Framing Britney Spears; she expressed regret over her monologue and claimed that she had not seen Spears' performance before going on stage.

In 2019, Silverman received death wishes from two Baptist pastors over her 2005 routine "Jesus is Magic", where she joked about killing Jesus: "I'm glad the Jews killed Jesus. I'd do it again!" In response, Silverman condemned the pastors and the "manipulation of what can be true".

Personal life
Silverman became a vegetarian at the age of 10. She is open about her lifelong battle with clinical depression, which at one point led to her developing an addiction to Xanax. She credited her subsequent emotional health to taking the prescription drug Zoloft. She struggled with bedwetting from the time she was young until well into her teens and stated in a 2007 interview that she had wet the bed recently.

Silverman's autobiography, published in April 2010, titled The Bedwetter, explores the subject of bedwetting as well as other personal stories from her life. She stated she did not want to get married until same-sex couples were able to. In 2014, she tweeted "Just read that I wanna get married which is hilarious b/c I will never get married," adding, "Why would I want the govt involved in my love life? Ew. It's barbaric."

She stated that she does not want to have biological children because "there's just millions of kids that have no parents" in the world and to avoid the risk that they might inherit her depression. In 2017, Silverman also said that she has prioritized her artistic career, constantly on tour, instead of motherhood.

Silverman's real-life sister, Laura, played her sister on The Sarah Silverman Program. Another older sister, Susan, is a rabbi who lives in Jerusalem with her husband, Yosef Abramowitz, the co-founder and president of Arava Power Company, and their five children. Silverman considers herself culturally Jewish, which she has frequently mined for material, but says she is agnostic and does not follow Judaism, stating, "I have no religion. But culturally I can't escape it; I'm very Jewish."

In July 2016, Silverman spent a week in the intensive care unit at Cedars Sinai Hospital with epiglottitis.

In an interview on The Howard Stern Show in October 2018, Silverman revealed that she was one of several female comedians who witnessed fellow comic Louis C.K. masturbate, which she said was a consensual act. Silverman stated she felt the act was not abusive, because of the absence of a power differential between the two, but also stated that due to context, it was "not analogous" to what C.K. had done with the other women, which she said was "not OK".

Relationships
Silverman dated comedian Kevin Brennan in 1988.

Silverman dated comedian and fellow SNL writer Dave Attell.

Silverman began dating Jimmy Kimmel in 2002. She referred to the relationship in some of her comedy, joking: "I'm Jewish, but I wear this Saint Christopher medal sometimes; my boyfriend is Catholic – but you know ... it was cute the way he gave it to me. He said if it doesn't burn a hole through my skin, it will protect me." In July 2008, Vanity Fair reported that the couple had split. However, in October 2008, the media reported they were on "the road back to being together". The couple attended the wedding of Howard Stern and Beth Ostrosky, but split again in March 2009.

At the Emmy Awards in August 2014, Silverman acknowledged she and Welsh actor Michael Sheen were in a relationship. Silverman said in February 2018 that the two had broken up over the holidays.

On Howard Stern's SiriusXM radio show on November 17, 2020, she stated she was dating Rory Albanese, the former showrunner of The Daily Show.

Politics and activism

In 2015, Silverman signed an open letter which the ONE Campaign had been collecting signatures for; the letter was addressed to Angela Merkel and Nkosazana Dlamini-Zuma, urging them to focus on women, as they served as the head of the G7 in Germany and the African Union in Ethiopia, respectively, which would start to set the priorities in development funding in advance of a main UN summit in September 2015 that would establish new development goals for a generation.

Leading up to the 2016 US presidential election, she became increasingly politically active. In 2015, Silverman endorsed Vermont Senator Bernie Sanders for President of the United States, saying: "He says what he means and he means what he says and he's not for sale." She had previously introduced Sanders at a rally in Los Angeles, California that drew an audience of over 27,500 people.

She initially supported Sanders but, following the Democratic nomination, later spoke in support of Hillary Clinton at the 2016 Democratic National Convention. In her convention speech, she urged other Sanders supporters to back Clinton and, later, amid boos from some Sanders supporters, said: "Can I just say? To the 'Bernie or Bust' people, you're being ridiculous". In addition to discussing her regular use of cannabis on Conan and at the 66th Primetime Emmy Awards, Silverman has been vocal in her opposition to racial bias and unfair arrests for cannabis possession. She supports social justice programs to find work opportunities for non-violent offenders and was a primary investor in Lowell Herb Co, aiming to end cannabis prohibition in the United States.

Silverman again endorsed Bernie Sanders and campaigned for him for the 2020 US presidential election.

On September 23, 2020, she encouraged her Instagram followers to contact VoteRiders, a voter ID education organization, to make sure they have the necessary ID to vote".

She is a member of the Democratic Socialists of America.

Filmography

 Who's the Caboose? (1997)
 Way of the Gun (2000)
 School of Rock (2003)
 Sarah Silverman: Jesus Is Magic (2005)
 Funny People (2009)
 Saint John of Las Vegas (2009)
 The Muppets (2011)
 Wreck-It Ralph (2012)
 A Million Ways to Die in the West (2014)
 I Smile Back (2015)
 Ashby (2015)
 Popstar: Never Stop Never Stopping (2016)
 Battle of the Sexes (2017)
 The Book of Henry (2017)
 Ralph Breaks the Internet (2018)
 Space Jam: A New Legacy (2021)
 Marry Me (2022)

Discography

Albums

Singles

Audiobooks

Soundtracks

Books
  (Humor/Memoir)

Awards and nominations

References

External links
 
 
 
 
 
  in 2010
 TheJC.com: Interview with Sarah Silverman
 Sarah Silverman Video produced by Makers: Women Who Make America
 

 
1970 births
Living people
20th-century American actresses
20th-century American comedians
21st-century American actresses
21st-century American comedians
21st-century American memoirists
21st-century American women writers
Actors from Manchester, New Hampshire
Actresses from New Hampshire
American abortion-rights activists
American agnostics
American comedy musicians
American film actresses
American people of Polish-Jewish descent
American people of Russian-Jewish descent
American podcasters
American sketch comedians
American stand-up comedians
American television actresses
American television writers
American voice actresses
American women comedians
American women memoirists
American women podcasters
American women television writers
Audiobook narrators
Comedians from New Hampshire
People from Bedford, New Hampshire
Critics of religions
Jewish agnostics
Jewish American actresses
Jewish American female comedians
Late night television talk show hosts
American LGBT rights activists
Members of the Democratic Socialists of America
New Hampshire Democrats
New York University alumni
The New Yorker people
People with mood disorders
Screenwriters from New Hampshire
Writers from Manchester, New Hampshire
Childfree
Jewish American comedy writers